Fitzmorris is an Irish Hiberno-Norman surname originating in Counties Kerry, Galway, and Mayo. It is patronymic as the prefix Fitz- derives from the Latin filius, meaning "son of".
Its variants include FitzMorris, Fitz Morris, Fitz-Morris, fitz Morris; alternate spellings Fitzmaurice, Fitzmoris, Fitzmorys;  and the given-name-turned-surname Morris. Fitzmorris is uncommon as a given name.  

People with the name Fitzmorris include:

 Al Fitzmorris (born 1946), American former professional baseball player
 Jimmy Fitzmorris (1921–2021), American politician
 Tom Fitzmorris (born 1951), American radio host and author, New Orleans food critic

References

See also
 Fitzmaurice
 Morris

Irish families
Patronymic surnames